Gerhard Charles Aalders (25 March 1880 – 30 January 1961), usually styled as G. Ch. Aalders, was a Dutch Old Testament scholar. He was born in London to an English mother and a Dutch father. He studied from 1897 to 1903 at the Free University of Amsterdam. He served as a minister of the Reformed Churches in the Netherlands from 1903 to 1920, and as Professor of Old Testament at the Free University of Amsterdam from 1920 to 1950.

Aalders is best known for his books A Short Introduction to the Pentateuch (which I. Howard Marshall says kept him going during his student days) and The Problem of the Book of Jonah. He also wrote a number of commentaries in the Korte Verklaring series: Genesis, Daniel, Esther, Jeremiah, and Lamentations. He was an editor of the series "Commentaar op het Oude Testament" and wrote the commentary "Het Hooglied". He played a mayor role in creating the Dutch translation of the Bible of the Dutch Bible Society.

Historian George Harink suggests that, along with Seakle Greijdanus, F. W. Grosheide, and Jan Ridderbos, Aalders "took the lead in Neo-Calvinist exegetical production." According to historian of science Abraham Flipse, Aalders introduced American-style Young Earth creationism into the Netherlands in the 1930s.

References

1880 births
1961 deaths
People from London
Academic staff of Vrije Universiteit Amsterdam
Dutch biblical scholars
Old Testament scholars
Bible commentators
English emigrants to the Netherlands
English people of Dutch descent